Pionier Boys' School is a school for children with learning difficulties. It is situated in the Dorado Park suburb of Windhoek, the capital of Namibia. The only other school in Windhoek that caters for students with general learning difficulties is Eros School for Girls, although there are other schools for children with specific handicaps such as hearing and visual impairments.

Pionier Boys' School was established in 1955. There are 400 learners and 36 teachers at the school. One or two learners of the school are selected each year to serve on the Junior Council of the City of Windhoek.

Principals of the school
 Dr. J.H.S. Oosthuizen 1955-1960
 Mr. J. J. Vos 1960-1973
 Mr. A. J. Venter 1975-1977
 Mr. F. J. N. Steyn 1979-1980
 Mr. J. H. Swiegers 1981-1985
 Mr. Niewoudt
 Mr. Cloete
 Mr. Linde     1996 - 2001
 Mr. B. Eiseb 2001 - 2006
 Mr. Ock Van Wyk 2006 -

References

Schools in Windhoek
Educational institutions established in 1955
1955 establishments in South West Africa